Bassenge is a municipality of Wallonia located in the province of liège, Belgium. 

On 1 January 2006 Bassenge had a total population of 8,335. The total area is 38.17 km² which gives a population density of 218 inhabitants per km².

The municipality consists of the following districts: Bassenge, Boirs, Ében-Émael, Glons, Roclenge-sur-Geer, and Wonck.

Gallery

Historic sites
Fort Eben-Emael was a major fortress intended to defend Belgium against attack from Germany. Built in the 1930s, it was swiftly captured by German forces in May 1940 during the Belgian Campaign of the Second World War.

Eben-Ezer Tower, also known as le musée du silex (the museum of flint) is a fantastical tower built of flint rubble in the 1960s by Robert Garcet and decorated with mystical and religious symbols.

See also
 List of protected heritage sites in Bassenge

References

External links
 

 
Municipalities of Liège Province